Diego Ignacio Trujillo Dangond (born June 30, 1960) is a Colombian film and television actor. He is best known for playing Walter Blanco in the Colombian remake of Breaking Bad called  Metástasis.

Life and career
Trujillo studied at the Gimnasio Moderno school in Bogotá, where he occasionally did theatre as a hobby. After graduating, he decided to study architecture at the Pilot University of Colombia, and worked in that profession for twelve years.

In television he has had a long history and since 1993 has acted in many telenovelas.

His film career began in 2000 with his work in Taylor Hackford's film Proof of Life, starring Meg Ryan and Russell Crowe, in which he was cast because of his excellent command of English.

In 2013, Trujillo was cast as Walter Blanco in the Spanish-language remake of Breaking Bad entitled Metástasis.

Filmography

TV
 De pies a cabeza (1993)
 La maldición del paraíso (1993) 
 Tiempos difíciles (1995) 
 Mascarada (1995) 
 Perro amor (1998) 
 El fiscal (1999) 
 Por qué diablos (1999) 
 Brujeres (2000) 
 Pobre Pablo (2001) 
 La costeña y el cachaco (2003) - Simon (El Italiano)
 Todos quieren con Marilyn (2004) 
 Protagonistas de Novela 3 "El juicio final" (2004) 
 Los Reyes (2005) - Emilio Iriarte De las Casas
 Amas de casa desesperadas (2006–2008)
 Tiempo final (Fox) (2007)
 Infieles anónimos (2007) 
 El poder del diez (2008) - Presentador
 El Capo (Colombia) (2009)
 A corazón abierto (2010)
 La Pola (telenovela) (2010) - Domingo García
 ¿Dónde Carajos esta Umaña? (2012) - Patricio Umaña
 Metástasis (2014) - Walter Blanco

Movies
 Prueba de vida (2000)
 Tres hombres tres mujeres (2003)
 Cuando rompen las olas (2005)
 El trato (2005)
 Martillo (2005) 
 Dios los junta y ellos se separan (2006)
 Pócima (2008) - Tomas Herrera
 Riverside (2009)

Theater
 En carne propia (1996)
 Muelle oeste (2001)
 La noche árabe (2006)
 Cita a ciegas (2007)
 ¡Qué desgracia tan infinita! (2009) Stand up comedy
 El crédito (2016)

References

External links
 

Living people
1960 births
Male actors from Bogotá
Colombian male film actors
Colombian male telenovela actors
Colombian male television actors
20th-century Colombian male actors
21st-century Colombian male actors